Ophiomusium is a genus of brittle stars.

Species
Species:

Ophiomusium biconcavum 
Ophiomusium calathospongum 
Ophiomusium dizluense 
Ophiomusium eburneum 
Ophiomusium fitchii 
Ophiomusium granulosum 
Ophiomusium longecombense 
Ophiomusium lux 
Ophiomusium murravii 
Ophiomusium praecisum 
Ophiomusium ramsayi 
Ophiomusium rugosum 
Ophiomusium sentum 
Ophiomusium sinuatum 
Ophiomusium solodurense 
Ophiomusium stephensoni 
Ophiomusium vermiculatum 
Ophiomusium weymouthiense

References

 Thuy B, Gale AS, Kroh A, Kucera M, Numberger-Thuy LD, Reich M, et al. (2012) Ancient Origin of the Modern Deep-Sea Fauna. PLoS ONE 7(10): e46913. doi:10.1371/journal.pone.0046913

Ophiuroidea genera
Extant Early Cretaceous first appearances